Integra may refer to:
 Honda Integra, a compact car
 Integra Air, a Canadian airline
 Integra Bank, a regional bank headquartered in Evansville, Indiana
 Integra Hellsing, a main character of the manga and anime series Hellsing
 Integra Home Theater, a premium audio video components manufacturer
 Integra Martel, a character of the anime series Solty Rei
 Integra Signum, a (defunct) Swiss railroad signaling company
 Integra Telecom, an American telecommunications company
 Integra Technologies, an American outsourced semiconductor assembly And test (OSAT) service provider

See also 
 Integral (disambiguation)